The 1987 NBA draft was held on June 22, 1987, in New York City.

This draft included two future members of the NBA 50 Greatest Players list, David Robinson and Scottie Pippen, as well as fellow Hall of Famer Reggie Miller, who was named to the NBA 75th Anniversary Team. Other notable selections include Kevin Johnson, Kenny Smith,  Horace Grant,  Reggie Lewis, Muggsy Bogues, Mark Jackson, and Šarūnas Marčiulionis.  Also in this draft, former Florida Gators men's basketball head coach Billy Donovan (drafted 68th by the Utah Jazz), who led that program to NCAA Division I Men's Basketball Championships in 2006 and in 2007.

David Robinson did not join the NBA until the 1989–90 season due to his service commitment with the United States Navy. This was the last NBA draft to go over three rounds, as it was reduced to exactly three next year and later to two since 1989.

Draft selections

Notable post-second-round picks

These draft picks played at least one game in the NBA but were selected after the second round.

Notable undrafted players
These players were not selected in the draft but still appeared in at least one regular or postseason NBA game.

Early entrants

College underclassmen
The following college basketball players successfully applied for early draft entrance.

  Vincent Askew – F, Memphis (junior)
  Norris Coleman – F, Kansas State (sophomore)
  Kenny Drummond – G, High Point (junior)
  Derrick McKey – F, Alabama (junior)
  Russell Pierre – F, Virginia Tech (junior)
  Reinhard Schmuck – F, Baruch (junior)
  Kevin Smith – F, Minnesota (junior)

Other eligible players

See also
 List of first overall NBA draft picks

References

http://basketball.realgm.com/nba/draft/past_drafts/1987

Draft
National Basketball Association draft
NBA draft
NBA draft
1980s in Manhattan
Basketball in New York City
Sporting events in New York City
Sports in Manhattan
Madison Square Garden